Brian Dooley may refer to:

 Brian Dooley (writer) (born 1971), English television writer
 Brian J. Dooley (born 1963), Irish human rights activist and author